Vatan (Russian and Tajik: Ватан}}) is a jamoat in Tajikistan. It is located in Farkhor District in Khatlon Region. The jamoat has a total population of 23,123 (2015).

References

Populated places in Khatlon Region
Jamoats of Tajikistan